Nubkhaes (The Gold [=Hathor] appears) was an ancient Egyptian queen with the titles Great Royal Wife and the one united with the beauty of the white crown. She is so far only known from her family stela now in the Louvre and a few later references. The stela is the main monument of the queen. Here is mentioned her father Dedusobek Bebi and other family members, many of them high court officials. These are all datable to about the time of king Sobekhotep IV.

The husband of the queen is not mentioned on the stela, but it is assumed that he was one of the successors of Sobekhotep IV, as his wife is known and Nubkhaes belongs to a generation after Sobekhotep IV. Khons was a daughter of the queen. She married a vizier coming from Elkab.

Family

Theories
Aidan Dodson and Dyan Hilton suggest that she was married to either Sobekhotep V, Sobekhotep VI or Wahibre Ibiau.

References

18th-century BC women
Queens consort of the Thirteenth Dynasty of Egypt
Great Royal Wives